Cayman Islands competed at the 2019 World Aquatics Championships in Gwangju, South Korea from 12 to 28 July.

Swimming

Cayman Islands entered four swimmers.

Men

Women

Mixed

References

Nations at the 2019 World Aquatics Championships
Cayman Islands at the World Aquatics Championships
World Aquatics Championships